FINDECO House is a skyscraper in Lusaka, Zambia, and is the country's tallest building. It stands at 295 feet tall. Construction of the tower began in 1978 and ended in 1979.

References 

Skyscrapers in Zambia
Buildings and structures in Lusaka